Maxence Prévot (born 9 April 1997) is a French professional footballer who plays for Sochaux as a goalkeeper.

References

External links
 

1997 births
Living people
Sportspeople from Belfort
Association football goalkeepers
French footballers
France under-21 international footballers
France youth international footballers
FC Sochaux-Montbéliard players
Ligue 2 players
Footballers from Bourgogne-Franche-Comté